Sir Francis Cockburn (10 November 1780 – 24 August 1868) served in the British Army, played an important role in the early settlement of eastern Canada and was a colonial administrator.

Cockburn was born in England in 1780. He was the fifth and last son of Sir James Cockburn, 8th Baronet (1729–1804) and his second wife Augusta Anne Ayscough. His maternal grandfather was Francis Ayscough, Dean of Bristol and Royal tutor.

On 19 November 1804, at Harbledown, Kent, England, he married Alicia Arabella (1782-1854), daughter of Richard Sandys, a descendant of Archbishop Sandys.

Military career
He had first joined the 7th Dragoon Guards at the age of 19 and served in South America and the Iberian Peninsula. Following his marriage, he was sent to Canada in 1811 as a Captain in the Canadian Fencibles and fought in the War of 1812 against the United States. He served with the Quartermaster-General for Upper Canada at York and Kingston. In 1815, he became assistant quartermaster-general for Upper Canada and assisted in settling immigrants near Perth in the Bathurst District.

In 1818, he became deputy quartermaster-general for Upper and Lower Canada. He helped establish military settlements at Perth, Richmond, Lanark, the Bay of Quinte, Glengarry County and on the Saint-François River in Lower Canada. He also founded a village at Franktown, Ontario. In 1819, he accompanied the Duke of Richmond on the tour of Perth and Richmond which led to the Duke's death.

He returned to England in 1823. During his time there, he helped establish the price of lands for properties in Upper Canada and provided advice on the best locations for settlement in the region.

He served as superintendent of British Honduras from 1830 to 1837 and Governor of the Bahamas from 1837 to 1844. Cockburn Town, the largest settlement on San Salvador Island in the Bahamas, was named after him, as was Cockburn Island in Ontario.

Cockburn was knighted by Letters Patent on 8 Sept 1841.  He was promoted to the rank of Lieutenant-General in 1860.

He was buried at Harbledown, Kent, where he had married, on 29 August 1868.

References

External links
Biography at the Dictionary of Canadian Biography Online

1780 births
1868 deaths
British Army lieutenant generals
Upper Canada people
British people of the War of 1812
British colonial governors and administrators in the Americas
7th Dragoon Guards officers
British governors of the Bahamas
Francis
Younger sons of baronets
Lower Canada people
Governors of British Honduras